Thomas Kost (born 13 May 1969) is a German football manager.

References

1969 births
Living people
German football managers
SpVgg Greuther Fürth managers
Pierikos F.C. managers
German expatriate football managers
Expatriate football managers in Greece
German expatriate sportspeople in Greece